Ice King  is a fictional character in the American animated television series Adventure Time. The character was introduced as the main antagonist and, as Simon Petrikov, develops into a supporting character in later seasons. The character is voiced by Tom Kenny.

Originally depicted as an evil but incompetent wizard obsessed with kidnapping princesses, the character of Ice King was further developed in later seasons of the show. These later seasons portrayed Ice King as a lonely man driven insane by the magical crown which grants him ice powers. In the show's third season, he is revealed to have once been an ordinary human named Simon Petrikov before falling under the influence of the crown. He regains his memory after being stripped of his powers in the series finale "Come Along with Me."

Although the character initially garnered a lukewarm reception from critics, his later backstory and character development into a tragic figure were widely acclaimed. The crown's  influence over Ice King came to be seen as a complex depiction of social isolation and mental illness, notably Alzheimer's and bipolar disorder. The episodes "I Remember You" and "Simon & Marcy", which focus on the Ice King's paternal relationship with Marceline the Vampire Queen, are often considered two of the show's best.

Creation and design 

The character was first voiced by John Kassir in the short film "Adventure Time", which introduced the character. In the short, the protagonists Finn the Human (Jeremy Shada) and Jake the Dog (John DiMaggio) fight Ice King to rescue Princess Bubblegum, whom he has kidnapped. He is voiced by Tom Kenny in the television series. Kenny said that he approached the character as "a very real psychopath" who did not fully understand why his actions were wrong.

Pendleton Ward, the creator of Adventure Time, considered Ice King to be a "pathetic" character. Commenting on the character's sympathetic backstory, he said that he "enjoy[s] a villain that you fall in love with." The monologue in which Ice King reveals his tragic past in the third season two-part special "Holly Jolly Secrets" was written by creative director Patrick McHale.

Neil Strauss of Rolling Stone noted that the character bore some similarities to Ward, including his "Trotsky glasses", his large beard and his strong desire for social interaction. Strauss said that "If the Ice King is Ward's dark side, then Finn, the show’s 16-year-old protagonist, is his light side."

Appearances 
Ice King was introduced as an antagonist in the series. A wizard capable of creating and manipulating snow and ice, the Ice King is the ruler of the Ice Kingdom, which is inhabited by penguins. The Ice Kingdom is located in the land of Ooo, where the series takes place. About a thousand years before the start of the series, the Earth was ravaged by the Mushroom War, a nuclear conflict that mutated life and created the magical setting of Ooo. Ice King is introduced as an antagonist of the main characters Finn and Jake. A recurring plot point throughout the series is his attempts to kidnap princesses and force them to marry him, which are repeatedly foiled by Finn and Jake.

The Ice King's heart escapes his body in the first season episode "Ricardio the Heart Guy" and takes on anthropomorphic features. The heart, named Ricardio (George Takei), competes with Finn for the affections of Princess Bubblegum (Hynden Walch). Ricardio tries to seduce Princess Bubblegum by impressing her with his knowledge of ancient technology. Ice King warns Finn and Jake of Ricardio's origins and evil nature, and they stop him before he can cut out Princess Bubblegum's heart and marry it. Ricardio returns in the fourth season episode "Lady & Peebles". He wears a paper mask and has fashioned arms and legs for himself out of Ice King's severed tissue, believing that this will make him more attractive to Princess Bubblegum. Ricardio kidnaps Finn and Jake so that she will try to rescue them. She defeats Ricardio in single combat.

The third season special "Holly Jolly Secrets" revealed that the Ice King was once an antiquarian named Simon Petrikov. He purchased a magical crown from a dockworker in northern Scandinavia. Simon soon discovered that wearing the crown was gradually turning his skin blue and making him act erratically. Simon's fiance Betty Grof (Lena Dunham) left him as a result of the crown's influence over him. The crown's magic allowed him to survive the apocalyptic Mushroom War.

In the fourth season episode "I Remember You", it is revealed that Simon met Marceline the Vampire Queen (Olivia Olson) when she was a young orphan, and helped her survive in the aftermath of the Mushroom War. Realizing that his mental health was rapidly degenerating, he wrote a letter to Marceline apologizing for anything he might do when he no longer remembers her. Despite not remembering their past, Ice King continually seeks out Marceline to be near her.  The relationship between Ice King and Marceline is further explored in the fifth season episode "Simon & Marcy", which reveals that he reluctantly began wearing the crown so that he could use its power to protect Marceline, despite knowing that this would eventually cause him to lose his mind. Simon eventually left Marceline, out of fear that the crown would eventually make him hurt her.

Ice King's powers are taken by Bella Noche, an anti-magic creature, in the fifth season episode "Betty". Freed from the magical influence of the crown, Ice King regains the memories of his identity as Simon but begins to die without the crown to keep him alive. With the help of Marceline, he creates a time portal so he can apologize to Betty, who jumps through the portal intent on saving him. Betty defeats Bella Noche, causing Simon to become the Ice King once more. Betty appears to die in an explosion, but secretly survives and begins looking for ways to free Simon from the crown. She absorbs the powers of Magic Man in the sixth season episode "You Forgot Your Floaties", intending to use these powers to try to cure Simon.

In the season eight episode "Elemental", Ice King accidentally frees the Ice Elemental Patience St. Pim (Lauren Lapkus). Patience St. Pim is defeated in the miniseries "Elements", which aired as part of Adventure Time season nine. Betty (Felicia Day) returns in the miniseries and unsuccessfully attempts to cure Ice King's insanity with magic. When this fails, Betty tries to alter the past to stop Simon from finding the crown and prevent the Mushroom War from taking place. Ice King stops Betty from changing the timeline, which would erase many of Ooo's inhabitants from existence.

Betty makes another attempt to restore Simon's mind in the series finale "Come Along with Me" by harnessing the power of the evil deity GOLB. They are both swallowed by GOLB, along with Finn. Inside of GOLB, Simon is stripped of his powers and freed from the crown's curse. Betty then uses the crown to transform GOLB into a less destructive deity by merging with it, sacrificing herself in the process. Afterwards, Ice King's penguin Gunter absorbs the crown and becomes the Ice Thing.

Other 
Ice King had a cameo appearance in Adventure Time: Distant Lands, a limited series based on Adventure Time. Simon Petrikov is confirmed to appear in the upcoming spin-off series Adventure Time: Fionna and Cake, which is based on gender flipped versions of characters from Adventure Time. The characters in Fionna and Cake were first introduced in the Adventure Time season three episode "Fionna and Cake", which revolved around gender flipped fanfiction written by Ice King.

He is the antagonist of the 2012 videogame Adventure Time: Hey Ice King! Why'd You Steal Our Garbage?!!. He also appeared in the 2013 videogame Adventure Time: Explore the Dungeon Because I Don't Know!. The comic book miniseries Adventure Time: Ice King was published by Boom! Studios in 2016. Ice King was also a main character in the 2019 comic book miniseries Marcy & Simon.

Characterization 
Ice King appears like an elderly man with blue skin, which is caused by the magical crown he wears. Wearing the crown grants him immortality, as well as the ability to control snow and ice. Although evil, Ice King is generally "incompetent" and "ineffectual" when it comes to carrying out his schemes. Throughout the show, Ice King is prone to misanthropy and depressive episodes, and he expresses anxiety over his body image. Despite being interested in living a normal life, Ice King's awkward and harmful behaviors drive away friends and potential romantic partners.

It is later revealed that wearing the crown drove him insane, and caused him to lose all memories of his past life as a kind man named Simon Petrikov. Simon's personality at times surfaces, but is generally repressed by the personality of the Ice King. Liz Baessler of Film School Rejects noted that, because of the amnesia and personality changes caused by the crown, "[Simon and Ice King] are two unique consciousnesses in one body."

The character's amnesia and mental health issues have been described as a metaphor for Alzheimer's disease and senility.  His mental and emotional instability has also been interpreted as a representation of bipolar disorder by some critics. Simon's mental health is not completely restored after he is freed from the crown's curse at the end of the series, instead he continues to deal with the effects of his life experience.

Novelist Lev Grossman, in an interview with NPR, praised the backstory of the Ice King and the exploration of his condition, noting that his origin is "psychologically plausible." He also stated, "My dad has been going through having Alzheimer's, and he's forgotten so much about who he used to be. And I look at him and think this cartoon is about my father dying."

Relationships 
Simon was engaged to Betty Grof, who left him after the crown began to affect his mental health. The loss of Betty, whom he nicknamed "his princess," led to the Ice King's obsession with kidnapping princesses. Despite this breakup, Simon and Betty have an enduring bond that "stretches across boundaries of space and time." Later in the series, she time travels to the future, intent on curing him of his insanity and restoring Simon. She becomes fixated on restoring Simon to the way she remembered him, despite Ice King's desire to remain the way he is. After Betty sacrifices herself to cure Simon and defeat GOLB, he struggles to move on but eventually does.

Ice King has a complicated relationship with Marceline the Vampire Queen, whom he found in the wreckage of the Mushroom War when she was seven years old. He became a father figure to Marceline, protecting her from mutants and gifting her the stuffed animal Hambo, which became her most prized possession. Writing for IndieWire, Eric Kohn compared the relationship between Ice King and Marceline in the flash-back episodes to the Man and Boy in Cormac McCarthy's post-apocalyptic novel The Road. This similarity was also acknowledged by the creative team of Adventure Time, who described the episode "Simon & Marcy" as "The Road for kids" when pitching it to Cartoon Network.

After learning of his past from Marceline, Finn and Jake become kinder to Ice King and start inviting him to social events. Ice King in turn gradually became less evil as those around him became understanding of his struggles. His relationship with Princess Bubblegum also becomes less antagonistic, despite his repeated attempts to kidnap her in the beginning of the series. Ice King is accompanied by Gunter, a penguin who acts as his friend and servant. It is later revealed that Gunter is Orgalorg, a powerful being that attempted to destroy the world in the past and was turned into a harmless penguin.

Reception 

The character originally earned a mixed reception, with some critics considering him to be a one-dimensional villain. Oliver Sava of The A.V. Club described his character in the show's early seasons as "a princess-stealing villain in the Gargamel mold." However, Ice King's characterization was considered to improve from the third season onwards, as his backstory established him as a more complex character experiencing mental illness and social isolation. TV.com stated, "it's sort of amazing how Adventure Time has transformed the Ice King from an irritating antagonist to one of the most tragic figures on television."

The fourth-season episode "I Remember You", which focuses on the Ice King's relationship with Marceline, is considered a turning point in the show's portrayal of Ice King. Charlie Jane Anders of io9 called the episode "one of the most intense things I've seen in ages". Dan Persons of Tor.com ranked it #3 on his list of "Ten Heartbreakingly Brilliant Works of Animation." The episode "Simon & Marcy" also received praise, and was nominated for a Primetime Emmy at the 65th Primetime Emmy Awards. Both episodes were included on Geek.com's list of the show's best 10 episodes.

Juliet Kleber in The New Republic also praised the character's arc, saying that:The series’ first antagonist, the Ice King, is revealed to have once been a human scientist, turned mad by the magic crown he used to protect a young Marceline in the ruins of human civilization. It was a moving character arc revealed over many seasons, woven deftly into the series mythology, turning one of the show’s most outlandish characters into a complex, tragic figure.

In a retrospective review of the series, Eric Thurm of Vulture called the Ice King "Adventure Time’s Best Character" and opined that the character's appeal came from his complex flaws. He felt that Ice King embodied both intense struggles such as Alzheimer's and more mundane issues like social awkwardness, making him relatable to a wide audience.

See also 
 List of Adventure Time characters

References 

Adventure Time characters
Fictional antiquarians and curators
Fictional characters with ice or cold abilities
Fictional kidnappers
Fictional kings
Fictional characters with dementia
Male characters in animated series
Male characters in television
Television characters introduced in 2008
Fictional wizards